"Quevedo: Bzrp Music Sessions, Vol. 52" is a 2022 song by Bizarrap and Quevedo.

Quédate may also refer to:

 "Quédate" (Soraya song), 1996
 "Quédate" (Pee Wee song), 2009
 "Quédate" (Henry Santos song), 2016